Liolaemus frassinettii is a species of lizard in the family  Liolaemidae. It is native to Chile.

References

frassinettii
Reptiles described in 2007
Reptiles of Chile
Endemic fauna of Chile